Gyldendal Norsk Forlag AS, commonly referred to as Gyldendal N.F. and in Norway often only as Gyldendal, is one of the largest  Norwegian publishing houses. It was founded in 1925 after buying rights to publications from the Danish publishing house Gyldendal, which the company also takes it name from.

Gyldendal Norsk Forlag AS
Gyldendal Norsk Forlag AS was founded in 1925. It was established when a group of Norwegian investors "bought home" the works of "The Four Greats" and Knut Hamsun, which had previously been published by the Danish publishing house Gyldendal. Harald Grieg had a central role in this operation and became the new company's director, and Knut Hamsun provided significant capital and became its largest shareholder.

The company publishes both fiction, non-fiction, school books and children books. Gyldendal owns 50% of Kunnskapsforlaget, along with Aschehoug, which publishes encyclopedias, dictionaries and other reference books, including the Store norske leksikon. Gyldendal also publishes the literary magazine Vinduet. The company is organised as a division of Gyldendal ASA, a holding company which is listed on the Oslo Stock Exchange.

Gyldendal Norsk Forlag AS consists of the following four divisions: Gyldendal Litteratur, Gyldendal Undervisning, Gyldendal Akademisk and Gyldendal Rettsdata.

Gyldendal ASA
Gyldendal ASA is a Norway-based holding company active within the publishing sector. The Company is operational through Gyldendal Norsk Forlag AS, a wholly owned publishing house plus four other principal subsidiaries:  Ark Bokhandel AS, a wholly owned book store; Kunnskapsforlaget ANS, a 50%-owned book company that specializes in dictionaries and encyclopedias; Forlagssentralen ANS, 50%-owned company which manages the Company's logistics and transport operations, and De norske Bokklubbene AS, a 48.5%-owned book club.

Executive officers
Since 1925, Gyldendal has been led by these people: 
1925–1941: Harald Grieg
1942–1944: Tore Hamsun
1945–1970: Harald Grieg
1970–1980: Ingebrikt Jensen
1980–1990: Andreas Skartveit
1990–1995: Nils Kåre Jacobsen
1995–2015: Geir Mork
2016–present: John Tørres Thuv

References

External links
 Gyldendal Norsk Forlag
 Gyldendal ASA

Publishing companies established in 1925
1925 establishments in Norway
Publishing companies of Norway
Companies listed on the Oslo Stock Exchange
Book publishing companies of Norway